The Mill Creek Generating Station is a coal-fired power plant owned and operated by Louisville Gas & Electric in the Kosmosdale neighborhood of Louisville, Kentucky. It is located 20 miles southwest of Downtown Louisville.

Emissions Data
 2006  Emissions: 10,089,535 tons
 2006  Emissions: 25,464 tons
 2006  Emissions per MWh:
 2006  Emissions: 12,594 tons
 2005 Mercury Emissions: 361 lb.

See also 

Coal mining in Kentucky

References

External links 
 http://www.lge-ku.com/ku/ku_plant_info.asp
 http://www.pbase.com/image/123298525

Energy infrastructure completed in 1972
Coal-fired power plants in Kentucky
Buildings and structures in Louisville, Kentucky
1972 establishments in Kentucky